The A.J. Holman and Company at 1222-26 Arch Street between N. 12th and N. 13th Street in the Center City area of Philadelphia was built in 1881 and was designed by the Wilson Brothers, who also designed the nearby Reading Terminal. Andrew J. Holman founded the Bible-publishing business in 1872 and had this building constructed when their original space became too small for the growing company.

The front facade of the five-story, red brick building features cast iron piers on the first floor and a triangular pediment with Gothic arch at the roofline. It is one of the few commercial loft buildings from the period in Philadelphia which have not been extensively changed.

The building was added to the National Register of Historic Places in 1984.

See also

References
Notes

External links

Industrial buildings and structures on the National Register of Historic Places in Philadelphia
Industrial buildings completed in 1881
Chinatown, Philadelphia
1881 establishments in Pennsylvania
Defunct book publishing companies of the United States